Oqdaryo District is a district of Samarqand Region in Uzbekistan. The capital lies at the town Loyish.

The district consists of 10 urban-type settlements (Loyish, Dahbed, Avazali, Bolta, Qirqdarxon, Kumushkent, Oytamgʻali, Oqdaryo, Yangiqoʻrgʻon, Yangiobod) and 6 rural communities.

References 

Samarqand Region
Districts of Uzbekistan